Shirur taluka, is a taluka in Haveli subdivision of Pune district of state of Maharashtra in India. The town is situated on the bank of river Ghod and hence it was also known as Ghodnadi in 20th Century. The town is on the border of Pune & Ahmed Nagar District and hence, main trading center for Shirur Taluka as well as Parner Taluka located in Ahmed Nagar District.

The town  has good schools and colleges. The multi-faith population inhibits the town. Three Suger Factories are located in this Taluk. The famous Ranjangaon MIDC is host many multinational manufacturing companies .

Further reading
Mulit-disciplinary Sustainable Engineering - Current and future trends.

See also

 Shirur, Maharashtra
 Talukas in Pune district
 Zilla Parishad Primary School Kardelwadi a renowned school in the taluka.

References

Talukas in Pune district
Talukas in Maharashtra